David Pearson Wright (born 1953) is an American theologian and the professor of Bible and the Ancient Near East at Brandeis University. He is a scholar in the field of the Hebrew Bible, especially the composition of the Pentateuch and inner-biblical exegesis, as well as Near Eastern and biblical ritual and law in comparative perspective.

Wright earned his doctorate from the University of California, Berkeley and is well known for his work Inventing God's Law: How the Covenant Code of the Bible Used and Revised the Laws of Hammurabi (Oxford University Press, 2009). He is also the author of The Disposal of Impurity: Elimination Rites in the Bible and in Hittite and Mesopotamian Literature (Scholars Press, 1987) and Ritual in Narrative: The Dynamics of Feasting, Mourning, and Retaliation Rites in the Ugaritic Tale of Aqhat (Eisenbrauns, 2001). He is currently working on a commentary on Leviticus in the Hermeneia series (Fortress Press, forthcoming).

References 

Faculty page at Brandeis University

21st-century American theologians
20th-century American theologians
Brandeis University faculty
University of California, Berkeley alumni
1953 births
Living people